ADB or adb may refer to:

Banking
 African Development Bank (also AfDB), a multilateral development finance institution
 Agricultural Development Bank (disambiguation), several financial institutions:
 Agricultural Development Bank of Ghana
 Agricultural Development Bank of Pakistan
 Agricultural Development Bank of Trinidad and Tobago
 Asian Development Bank, a regional development bank

Technology
 Access DataBase, referring to a file managed by the Access Database Engine
 Advanced Debugger, a general-purpose debugger for Unix platforms
 Advanced Digital Broadcast, supplier of digital TV set-top-boxes for cable, satellite, terrestrial and telecommunications
 Android Debug Bridge, a command-line tool for Android
 Apple Desktop Bus, a bit-serial computer bus for connecting low-speed devices to computers

Gaming
 Active Dimension Battle, a battle system in computer gaming
 Amarillo Design Bureau, the producer of the Star Fleet Universe series of games and related background material

Literature and publications
 Allgemeine Deutsche Biographie, a biographical reference work in the German language
 Australian Dictionary of Biography, Australia's pre-eminent dictionary of national biography
 Approved Document B, the official building code guidance document on fire for England and Wales; see Building regulations in the United Kingdom

Other uses
 Adnan Menderes Airport (IATA airport code), Izmir, Turkey
 Atauran (ISO 639-3 code: adb), of the Wetarese language of East Timor 
 Antonov Airlines (ICAO code designator)